The Vinegar Hill Historic District is a historic district and neighborhood in Bloomington, Indiana, United States.  Built primarily in the second quarter of the twentieth century, and located a few blocks south of  Indiana University Bloomington campus, Vinegar Hill has been the home of leading Indiana University faculty members. It has inspired literary attention, and it has been designated a historic site.

Construction
Rapid growth in the importance of Bloomington's limestone industry made limestone company executives wealthy and created heavy demand for skilled stonecutters in the city.  As limestone became the city's leading industry in the 1920s, an apple orchard was removed to permit the extension of First Street eastward up a long hill and the platting of a new neighborhood.  Several other city neighborhoods, such as the distinctive Prospect Hill, already bore topographical names; according to local tradition, the fermentation of apples from the orchard produced a distinctive smell that became the neighborhood's namesake.  The first families to build houses in this new development were those of stonecutters, many of whom were European immigrants.  Leading among these families were the Donatos, whose members built seven significant houses in the neighborhood.  Because so many of the new residents were skilled stoneworkers, they decorated their houses with carvings and sculptures that would have been far too expensive for all but the richest members of society.  At the top of Vinegar Hill were the mansions of the wealthy limestone executives; like the workers' houses below them, these homes featured ornate stonework with images such as those of the children of the homeowners.  Yet other residents of the district were some prominent Indiana University faculty, including sexology professor Alfred Kinsey, music dean Winfred Merrill, and Nobel-winning biology professor Hermann Muller.

Architecture
As limestone workers and owners, the residents of Vinegar Hill naturally looked to limestone as the material for their own houses.  They used these materials to construct residences in a wide range of architectural styles, including American Craftsman, Neoclassical, and Art Deco.  Inside, the houses were also ornate: many feature mantels and balusters of carven stone, and the four houses built by Christopher Donato also include elaborate transoms and lintels.  The most prominent houses in the neighborhood are the hilltop homes of the wealthy near the eastern end of the district; here may be found styles such as Tudor Revival and Georgian-influenced Colonial Revival.  Throughout the district, many houses are found in various forms of Colonial and English Revivals, and multiple Spanish Colonial Revivals are among the most significant residences of the lower part of the hill.  Among the books that have concentrated on the architecture of Vinegar Hill is Carol Shields' novel The Stone Diaries, in which the neighborhood is part of the setting for much of the novel.

Closely related to the neighborhood's distinctive architecture is the unusually significant lawn furniture present around many of the houses.  Objects such as detailed individual portraits, carvings of lions and griffins, and sculptures of children make the neighborhood unique: it is the only neighborhood anywhere in Indiana in which lawn furniture is a major element of the area's historic nature.

Historic assessment
Between 1999 and 2001, historic preservation officials working with the city of Bloomington surveyed the entire city and identified over two thousand buildings that were deemed to be historic to one extent or another, most of which were concentrated in several historic districts.  Composing one of these districts were sixty-one buildings on Vinegar Hill; deemed contributing properties, they help to make the district historic.  These buildings were divided into three classifications: Outstanding, Notable, and Contributing.  Properties rated as "Outstanding" were deemed to be historically significant enough to deserve consideration for inclusion on the National Register of Historic Places by themselves; "Notable" properties were worthy of special consideration, although not likely to be worthy of individual National Register status; "Contributing" locations were seen as significant parts of their historic districts, but not of great significance by themselves.  Eight of Vinegar Hill's contributing properties received an "Outstanding" rating, and thirteen were deemed "Notable;" only thirty-one were called "Contributing."  The district includes a disproportionately large number of above-average properties: about 13% of the city's sites were named either "Notable" or "Outstanding," in contrast to 40% of those on Vinegar Hill.  Particularly unusual is the concentration of eight "Outstanding" properties, which represented one-eighth of all such buildings citywide.

In 2003, a movement started to have Vinegar Hill accorded the national recognition that it was seen as lacking, and the city received a historic preservation grant from the state government for use in the district.  In an attempt to have it nominated to the National Register of Historic Places, an Indiana University class began collecting detailed information about the district's houses and interviewed many residents in order to gather support for the proposed nomination.  Support grew for according federal recognition to the neighborhood, and it was officially added to the National Register on June 17, 2005.  Although the city-designated historic district encompasses fifty-two contributing properties, all of which are buildings, the area designated as historic by the federal government comprises seventy-one contributing buildings and thirty-eight other contributing sites, structures, and objects.

Table of contributing properties

Appearing in the table below are the buildings included within the boundaries of the city-designated historic district.

References

External links
Detailed district map
Walking tour of Vinegar Hill

Buildings and structures in Bloomington, Indiana
Houses on the National Register of Historic Places in Indiana
Limestone buildings in the United States
Neighborhoods in Indiana
Houses in Monroe County, Indiana
Historic districts on the National Register of Historic Places in Indiana
Historic districts in Monroe County, Indiana
National Register of Historic Places in Monroe County, Indiana